Vanessa Proux (born 31 May 1974) is a French biologist and the current President of Institut Sup'Biotech de Paris.

Holder of a Master's degree in biochemistry (1997) and another one in enzyme engineering, microbiology and bioconversion, Vanessa Proux graduated from University of Technology of Compiègne in October 2001 (Doctorate in enzyme engineering, microbiology and bioconversion). From 2001 to 2003, she was research engineer at the biological department of the Commissariat à l'énergie atomique. At the end of 2003, she was hired by the Institute of biochemistry, molecular biophysics and cells of the Paris-Sud 11 University. In parallel, she teaches chemistry and enzymology at the UTC and Sup'Biotech.

Since February 2004, she is the President of the Institut Sup'Biotech de Paris.

Vanessa Proux has written several scientific articles in journals with international editorial board.

Bibliography 
 Biotechnologies. Les promesses du vivant., Villejuif, FYP Éditions, 2015, 256 p.

References 

1974 births
French women biologists
Living people
Women heads of universities and colleges
Heads of universities in France